Reitwein is a municipality in the district Märkisch-Oderland, in Brandenburg, Germany. It is located near the border with Poland.

Demography

References

External links

Localities in Märkisch-Oderland